Squalius kottelati, also known as the Cilician pike chub, is a species of ray-finned fish in the family Cyprinidae. It is endemic to the Ceyhan and Orontes River drainages in Turkey.

References

Squalius
Fish described in 2009